Nay Shwe Thway Aung (born 22 May  1991), also known as Phoe La Pyae, is a Burmese public figure and business tycoon, who is the grandson of Senior General Than Shwe, Myanmar's dictator and former head of a military junta. He is one of the country's top business tycoons in the list of individuals who provide political and financial support for Myanmar's ruling regime and government.

Early life and family
Nay Shwe Thway Aung was born on 22 May 1991 in Yangon, Myanmar, as the sole son of Nay Soe Maung, an army doctor, and his wife Kyi Kyi Shwe, a daughter of Than Shwe. He attended high school at Practising School Yangon Institute of Education and enrolled in West Yangon Technological University.

Business interests 
Nay Shwe Thway Aung is a major broker between the regime officials and business leaders. He has earned a reputation as one of the most notorious members of the ruling family. He has been accused of ordering military officers, serving as his assistants, to carry out attacks on business rivals, and even top generals are said to be wary of displeasing him. 
 
He has been involved in several business disputes with the sons of other top generals, including Aung Thet Mann, Toe Naing Mann and Shwe Mann. However, they always have to concede to Nay Shwe Thway Aung eventually.

He also has close ties to key figures such as business tycoon Zaw Zaw. Through their relationships, Zaw Zaw has won concessions and import licenses, including most of the country's car and motorcycle imports licenses, as well as import and distribution licenses for fuel.

According to business sources in Yangon, Nay Shwe Thway Aung took a new Mercedes Benz from a warehouse of the military-owned Union of Myanmar Economic Holding, Ltd (UMEHL), paying just 10 million kyat (US$11,600) for a luxury vehicle valued at least 200 million kyat ($230,000) in Burma.

Political ambitions
According to The Irrawaddy report from Naypyidaw, several military officers dislike him because he has assumed a high rank within the Myanmar military circles despite the fact that he has never served in the army. Displeasure was also expressed by the military elite that he was permitted to sit in the front row beside his grandfather at official photoshoots.

He has often appeared in Myanmar's state-run media alongside his dictator-grandfather at state ceremonies and diplomatic tours of inspection throughout the country.

He was also implicated in a drug scandal in Yangon in 2009. Two of his friends, business tycoon Maung Weik and a son of lieutenant general Ye Myint, Aung Zaw Ye Myint, were arrested.

In October 2008, he had used influence to get his girlfriend, model Nay Chi Lin Let, enrolled in the Institute of Medicine.

In 2010, Nay Shwe Thway Aung had run Yadanabon Cyber City, Myanmar's Silicon Valley and the government's Internet control center.

In October 2013, he was allegedly raided The Sunlight Journal, founded by Moe Hein, for published coverages of attacking him. He was accused of attacking and slapping a police officer, apparently for not clearing traffic for him in Yangon.

He was thought to be lined uptake over from his grandfather, Than Shwe, and take a leadership position within Myanmar's government.

On his 20th Birthday, Nay Shwe Thway Aung said, "I will not succeed ruling authority from my grandfather Than Shwe." In 2011, Than Shwe officially stepped down as head of state in favour of his hand-picked successor, Thein Sein to President of Burma.

On 4 December 2015, Nay Shwe Thway Aung and his grandfather Than Shwe met with Aung San Suu Kyi, he pledged to support her if she continues to work for the development of the country.

On 22 October 2016, Nay Shwe Thway Aung attended the state-level meeting between State Counsellor Aung San Suu Kyi and 158 country's top-listed taxpayers and cronies.

Music career
Nay Shwe Thway Aung has made music videos and sung cover songs of Enrique Iglesias. On 8 November 2018, he released a cover song of "Tonight (I'm Lovin' You)" on his Facebook, which racked up one million views within 24 hours. On 27 December 2018, he released a cover of Enrique Iglesias's "Hero" on his Facebook page. In this cover, he combined Burmese lyrics to the song.

He performed in the national level event Miss Universe Myanmar 2019.

References

External links

Partial List of Cronies Who Provide Political and Financial Support for Burma’s Ruling Regime: Nay Shwe Thway Aung No.28

Burmese businesspeople
1991 births
Living people
People from Yangon
Family of Than Shwe